In Roman mythology, the Camenae (also Casmenae, Camoenae) were originally goddesses of childbirth, wells and fountains, and also prophetic deities.

List of Camenae
There were four Camenae: 
Carmenta, or Carmentis
Egeria, or Ægeria, or Aegeria
Antevorta, or Porrima
Postverta, or Postvorta, or Prorsa

The last two were sometimes specifically referred to as the Carmentae and in ancient times might have been two aspects of Carmenta rather than separate figures; in later times, however, they are distinct beings believed to protect women in labor.

Carmenta was chief among the nymphs. Her festival day, the Carmentalia, featured water ritually drawn by Vestal Virgins from the spring outside the Porta Capena.

The Camenae were later identified with the Greek Muses; in his translation of Homer's Odyssey, Livius Andronicus rendered the Greek word Mousa as Camena and Horace refers to poetic inspiration as the "soft breath of the Greek Camena" (spiritum Graiae tenuem Camenae) in Odes II.16.

See also
Casmenae
Crinaeae
Naiad
Nymph
Pegasides

References

External links
Myth Index - Camenae

Childhood goddesses
Oracular goddesses
Roman goddesses
Water goddesses